The CAMP test (Christie–Atkins–Munch-Peterson) is a test to identify group B β-hemolytic streptococci (Streptococcus agalactiae) based on their formation of a substance (CAMP factor) that enlarges the area of hemolysis formed by the β-hemolysin elaborated from Staphylococcus aureus.

CAMP factor
Although the test is usually used to identify group B streptococcus, there is some evidence that the CAMP factor gene is present in several groups of streptococci, including group A.

A similar factor has been identified in Bartonella henselae.

Uses
The CAMP test can be used to identify Streptococcus agalactiae. Though not strongly beta-hemolytic on its own, group B strep presents with wedge-shaped colonies in the presence of Staphylococcus aureus.

It can also be used to identify Listeria monocytogenes which produces a positive CAMP reaction.

Setup

 Streak a beta-lysin–producing strain of aureus down the center of a sheep blood agar plate.
 The test organism streak should be 3 to 4 cm long.
 Streak test organisms across the plate perpendicular to the S. aureus streak within 2 mm. (Multiple organisms can be tested on a single plate).
 Incubate at 35°-37°C in ambient air for 18-24 hours.
 Wedge shaped pattern radiating from the test organism near the S. aureus indicates positivity

Reverse CAMP test

The reverse CAMP test is a method to identify Clostridium perfringens using β-hemolytic streptococci. The CAMP factor produced by S. agalactiae and the alpha toxin produced by C. perfringens act synergistically to produce enhanced hemolysis. Streaking these two organisms perpendicular to each other on a blood agar plate will yield a “bow tie” shaped zone of hemolysis which indicates a positive test.

History
CAMP is an acronym for "Christie–Atkins–Munch-Peterson", for the three researchers who discovered the phenomenon.

It is often incorrectly reported as the product of four people (counting Munch-Petersen as two people). The true relationship (three people) is the reason for two en dashes and then one hyphen in Christie–Atkins–Munch-Petersen.

The name of the test bears no relationship to the name of the second messenger cyclic adenosine monophosphate (commonly referred to as cAMP).

References

Medical tests
Microbiology techniques